Uncial 0173 (in the Gregory-Aland numbering), is a Greek uncial manuscript of the New Testament, dated paleographically to the 5th century.

Description 
The codex contains a small part of the Epistle of James 1:25-27, on one parchment leaf (8 cm by 6.5 cm). It is written in one column per page, 9 lines per page, in uncial letters. 

The Greek text of this codex is a representative of the Alexandrian text-type. Aland placed it in Category II. 

Currently it is dated by the INTF to the 5th century.

The text was published by Ermenegildo Pistelli and Mario Naldini.

The codex currently is housed at the Laurentian Library (PSI 5) in Florence.

See also 

 List of New Testament uncials
 Textual criticism

References

Further reading 

 Publicazioni della Societa Italiana (Papiri Greci e Latini) I, 5, ed. G. Vitelli, 1912.

External links 

 Biblioteca Medicea Laurenziana

Greek New Testament uncials
5th-century biblical manuscripts